The 1992–93 Penn State Nittany Lions men's basketball team represented the Pennsylvania State University during the 1992–93 NCAA Division I men's basketball season. The team was led by 10th-year head coach Bruce Parkhill, and played their home games at Rec Hall in University Park, Pennsylvania as members of the Big Ten Conference.

Schedule

Source

References

Penn State Nittany Lions basketball seasons
Penn State
1992 in sports in Pennsylvania
1993 in sports in Pennsylvania